Maynaguri Assembly constituency is an assembly constituency in Jalpaiguri district in the Indian state of West Bengal. It is reserved for scheduled castes.

Overview
As per orders of the Delimitation Commission, No. 16  Maynaguri Assembly constituency (SC) covers Mainaguri municipality and Maynaguri community development block,

Maynaguri Assembly constituency is part of No. 3  Jalpaiguri (Lok Sabha constituency) (SC).

Members of Legislative Assembly

Election Results

2021 Election

2016 Election

2014 bye election
In the 2014 by election, Ananta Deb Adhikari of All India Trinamool Congress defeated Dinabandhu Roy (Palu) of Revolutionary Socialist Party by 31,790 votes. The former RSP MLA switched over to Trinamool Congress and had to face election again.

2011
In the 2011 elections, Ananta Deb Adhikari of RSP defeated his nearest rival Juthika Roy Basunia of Trinamool Congress.

# Trinamool Congress did not contest this seat in 2006.

1977-2006
In the 2006, 2001 and 1996 state assembly elections, Bachchamohan Roy of RSP won the Maynaguri assembly seat (SC) defeating his nearest rivals Gokul Kumar Roy of BJP, Purnaprabha Barman of Trinamool Congress and Manmatha Ray Basunia of Congress respectively. Contests in most years were multi cornered but only winners and runners are being mentioned. Nityananda Adhikary of RSP defeated Manamatha Ray Basunia of Congress in 1991. Tarak Bandhu Roy of RSP defeated Manmatha Ray Basunia of Congress in 1987, Mridulendra Deb Rakshit of ICS in 1982 and Bhabendra Nath Roy Hakim of Janata Party in 1977.

1957–1972
Bijoy Krishna Mohanta of Congress won in 1972 and 1971. Jajneswar Roy of Congress won in 1969 and 1967. Kamini Mohan Roy of Congress won in 1962. Janjneswar Roy of Congress won in 1957. In independent India's first election in 1951, Surendra Nath Roy of Congress won from Mainaguri. Jajneswar Roy and Mangaldas Bhagat, both of Congress, won from the Central Duars joint seat.

References

Assembly constituencies of West Bengal
Politics of Jalpaiguri district